is a railway station located in Ibusuki, Kagoshima, Japan.
The station opened in 1934.

Line 
Kyushu Railway Company
Ibusuki Makurazaki Line

Layout

Adjacent stations

Nearby places
Ibusuki City Office
Jūchō Post Office
Kagoshima Prefectural Ibusuki High School
Mount Uomi
Chiringashima
National Route 226

Railway stations in Kagoshima Prefecture
Railway stations in Japan opened in 1934
Ibusuki, Kagoshima